First Circle may refer to:
In the First Circle, a novel by Aleksandr Solzhenitsyn
The First Circle (miniseries), based on the novel
The First Circle (1992 film), a Canadian-French television drama film
The First Circle (1973 film), an English-language drama film
First Circle (album), a 1984 album by the Pat Metheny Group
1st Circle, Amman, a large traffic circle in Amman, Jordan
The First Circle of Hell, in Dante's Inferno